Andrei Cristea-David (born 9 January 2000) is a Romanian retired professional footballer who plays as a goalkeeper. In 2016 he signed with Gaz Metan, but he played mainly for the second team of the club, in the Liga III. On 15 December 2018 he made his Liga I debut, in a match between Gaz Metan Mediaș and FC Hermannstadt (known as Sibiu Derby), ended with the score of 0-2. In the summer of 2021 he retired due to multiple injuries.

International career
Andrei Cristea-David played at international level for Romania U17 and U19 teams.

References

External links
 
 
 Andrei Cristea-David at lpf.ro

2000 births
Living people
Footballers from Bucharest
Romanian footballers
Romania youth international footballers
Association football goalkeepers
Liga I players
CS Gaz Metan Mediaș players